= Bonitai =

Town of ancient Lydia

Coordinates: 38°00′36″N 27°29′54″E

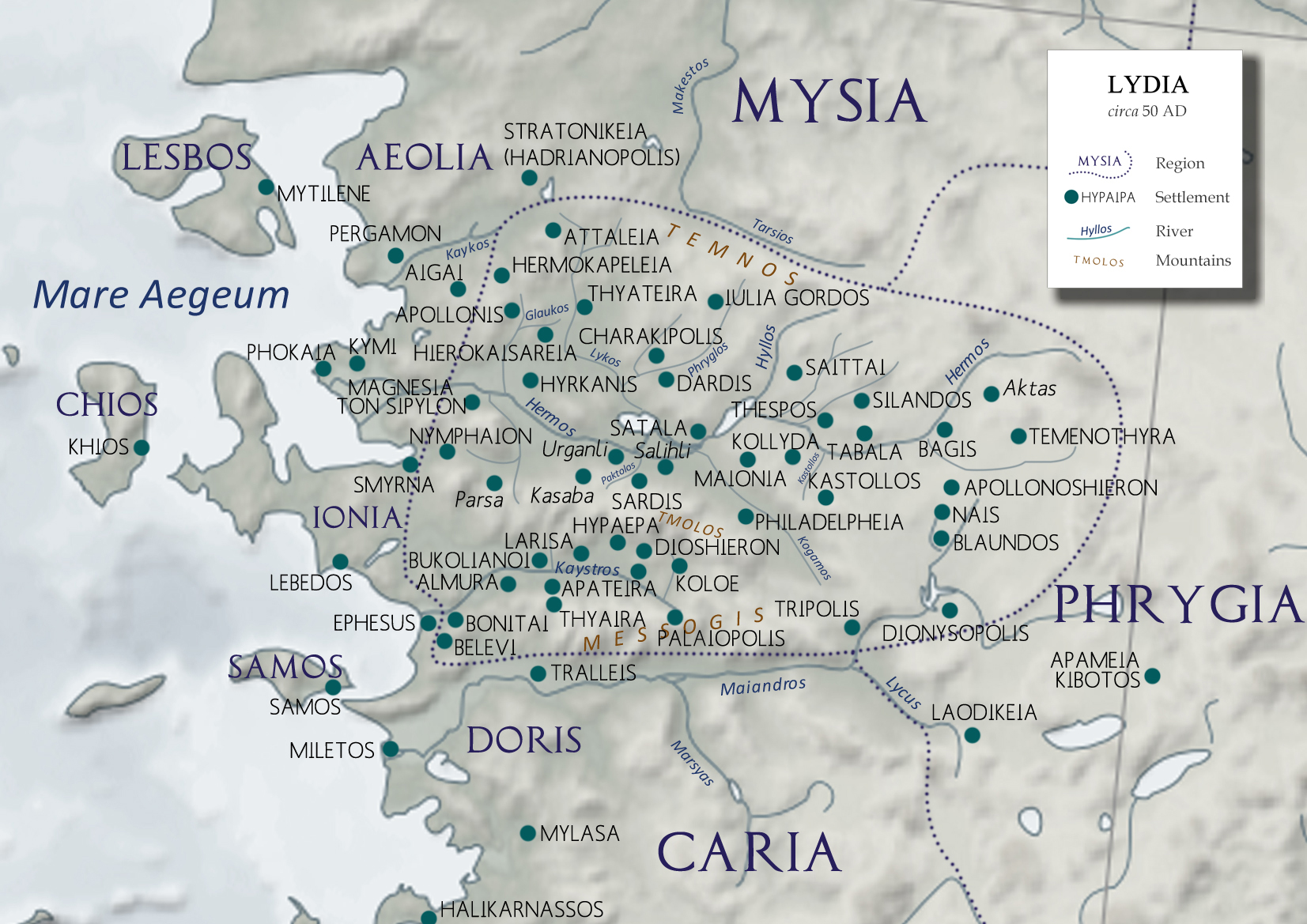
Lydia in about 50CE.

Bonitai or Boneita was a town of ancient Lydia, near Ephesus, inhabited during Roman times.

Its site is located near Küçükkale in Asiatic Turkey.
